Kura or Kurkosa, also known as Kurinskiy in the Russian language, is the largest island of Azerbaijan.

History
The island was formerly attached to the mainland by a narrow spit. It was named Kurkosa after the Kura River located further north by Fedor I. Soimonov, the pioneering explorer of the Caspian Sea during the time of Peter I the Great. Soimonov wrote the 'Pilot of the Caspian Sea', the first report on that until then little known body of water, that was published in 1720 by the Russian Academy of Sciences.

In Soviet times there were two villages on the island with a population of almost 3,000 souls. However, the rise of the Caspian Sea level cut Kura Island off from the mainland making communication problematic. As a result in 1981 most inhabitants were evacuated. By 2009 only about 10 people lived on Kura Island. The last inhabitant of the island passed away in 2020.

Geography
Although located quite far away from it, it is considered the southernmost island of the Baku Archipelago.

The island is low, with mudhills, and stretches in a NE to SW direction.

There is a lighthouse on Kura that was built in 1911 and abandoned in 1966.

Kura Stone
Kura Rock or Kura Stone (Kurinskiy Kamen), is a small islet with a maximum length of 0.18 km.

See also

Ghizil-Agaj State Reserve
List of islands of Azerbaijan

References

External links
The Kura Delta

Islands of Azerbaijan
Islands of the Caspian Sea
Uninhabited islands of Azerbaijan